Lake Bohinj, covering , is the largest permanent lake in Slovenia. It is located within the Bohinj Valley of the Julian Alps, in the northwestern Upper Carniola region, and part of Triglav National Park.

Geography

It is a glacial lake dammed by a moraine.
The largest of the streams that flow into the lake, the Savica ('little Sava'), is fed from Črno jezero (Black Lake), the lowest-lying lake in the Triglav Lakes Valley. The outflow at the eastern end is the Jezernica creek which merges with the Mostnica to form the Sava Bohinjka, which in turn becomes the larger Sava River at the confluence with the Sava Dolinka. As found out already by Belsazar Hacquet in the 18th century, much more water leaves Lake Bohinj than enters it, which is explained with subterranean sources of water.

The clear waters are the habitat of brown trout, burbot, European chub, common minnow and Arctic char, eight genera of molluscs, as well as of numerous algae species. It is a popular day trippers' destination for swimming and other water sports. On the shore is a statue of the legendary Goldhorn (Zlatorog) chamois, whose story was perpetuated by the poet Rudolf Baumbach.

Notes

References

External links

 Lake Bohinj web cam
 Lake Bohinj 1920x1080 photos

Bohinj
Bohinj
Sava basin
Municipality of Bohinj
Wetlands of Slovenia